Grover Cleveland High School is a large, comprehensive high school in Ridgewood, Queens. Grover Cleveland High School, Bayside High School, Samuel J. Tilden High School, Abraham Lincoln High School, John Adams High School, Walton High School, and Andrew Jackson High School were all built during the Great Depression from one set of blueprints in order to save money. The school is named after former US president Grover Cleveland.

Extracurricular activities

Sports
Sports teams include:

Boys
Baseball (Varsity and Junior Varsity)
Basketball (Varsity and Junior Varsity)
Bowling (Varsity)
Cross Country
Handball
Indoor Track (Varsity)
Outdoor Track (Varsity)
Soccer (Varsity)
Swimming (Varsity)
Tennis (Varsity)
Volleyball (Varsity)
Wrestling

Girls
Basketball (Varsity and J.V.)
Bowling (Varsity)
Indoor Track
Outdoor Track
Swimming (Varsity)
Tennis (Varsity)
Volleyball (Varsity and J.V.)

Academic teams
Physics
Robotics
Science Olympiad
Science Research
Debate (won the 2009 NYC Lincoln-Douglas Debate Championships in the Rising Star Tier)

Yearbook
The yearbook was called the Cleveland Log.

Notable alumni
Cheryl James – singer from Grammy Award-winning Salt-N-Pepa
Jim Gordon – sportscaster
Marisol Maldonado – model
Thomas P. Noonan, Jr. – Medal of Honor USMC veteran
Rosie Perez – award-winning actress, activist
Emanuel Xavier – award-winning poet, LGBTQ activist
Bob Sheppard – Yankee Stadium announcer
Joe Massino – "The Last Don," final head of the Bonanno Crime Family
Julius LaRosa – singer and entertainer 
Catherine Nolan – Assemblywoman of District 37 Ridgewood, Queens
Salvatore Vitale – former underboss of the Bonanno crime family
Joshua Hong – member of the band Seventeen
Gerard Yantz – member of the United States field handball squad which played at the 1936 Summer Olympics
George Eisenbarth – expert in type 1 diabetes

References

External links

Grover Cleveland High School - New York City Department of Education

Public high schools in Queens, New York
Ridgewood, Queens